The spotted houndshark, Triakis maculata, is a houndshark of the family Triakidae found in tropical waters in the eastern Pacific Ocean off the coast of South America. Their diet is believed to consist mainly of crustaceans.

Description
It is a robust species with a rounded snout, widely separated, lobed nasal flaps, and long upper lip grooves that extend as far as the junction of the jawbones. The teeth have straight, erect cusps and are not blade-like. The first dorsal fin has a sloping posterior margin and the pectoral fins are broadly falcate (long and curved). Sometimes the body is uniform in colour but more often it is finely spotted with black.

Distribution
The spotted houndshark is found on the continental shelves in the eastern Pacific, from the Galapagos Islands and Peru southwards to the north of Chile, between latitudes 0° and 30° S.

Status
The spotted houndshark is caught for human consumption by gillnet, and sometimes by trawling, in artisan fisheries mainly in Peru, along with the humpback smooth-hound (Mustelus whitneyi) and the speckled smooth-hound (M. mento), collectively known (in Spanish) as "tollo" in local fisheries. Of these three fish species, the spotted houndshark is probably less common than the other two and its total numbers seem to be declining. Some control over fishing has been instituted by the introduction of a minimum size requirement, but this has been set rather low in relation to the size of the fish at sexual maturity. The IUCN has rated the conservation status of this fish as being "Critically Endangered". With the decline in the main species sought (M. whitneyi), fishing pressure has decreased and further monitoring is required to assess whether the population trend will be reversed.

References

spotted houndshark
Ovoviviparous fish
Fish of the Pacific Ocean
Fish of Peru
Western South American coastal fauna
Galápagos Islands coastal fauna
spotted houndshark